

Notes

References 

Papua (province)